Ovidijus is a Lithuanian masculine given name. People with the name Ovidijus include:
Ovidijus Galdikas (born 1988), Lithuanian basketball player
Ovidijus Verbickas (born 1993), Lithuanian footballer
Ovidijus Varanauskas (born 1991), Lithuanian basketball player 
Ovidijus Vyšniauskas (born 1957), Lithuanian musician

References

Lithuanian masculine given names